UIN may refer to:

Common
 User Identification Number, used by many computer security systems and ICQ, see ICQ#UIN, Unique identifier and User (computing)
 Universal Identification Number
used for people, see National identification number and Unique Identification Authority of India, see also Permanent account number (PAN)
used for inventory, see also UID
 University Identification Number, used by many universities for students, faculty and alumni
 Unit Identification Number, used by the military, see Military unit
 Unit Identification Number, used by the Department of Education, see Integrated Postsecondary Education Data System
 Unique Identification Number, similar to Universal Identification Number used for people and inventory, see above, and often replaced by Universally unique identifier (UUID)

Other uses
 User Intelligent Network, a type of network artificial intelligence, see, for example Personal communications network	
 Airport code for Quincy Regional Airport in Illinois, United States